

390001–390100 

|-bgcolor=#f2f2f2
| colspan=4 align=center | 
|}

390101–390200 

|-bgcolor=#f2f2f2
| colspan=4 align=center | 
|}

390201–390300 

|-bgcolor=#f2f2f2
| colspan=4 align=center | 
|}

390301–390400 

|-bgcolor=#f2f2f2
| colspan=4 align=center | 
|}

390401–390500 

|-bgcolor=#f2f2f2
| colspan=4 align=center | 
|}

390501–390600 

|-bgcolor=#f2f2f2
| colspan=4 align=center | 
|}

390601–390700 

|-bgcolor=#f2f2f2
| colspan=4 align=center | 
|}

390701–390800 

|-id=743
| 390743 Telkesmária ||  || Mária Telkes (1900–1995) was a Hungarian-born American physical chemist and biophysicist, best known for her invention of the solar distiller and the first solar-powered heating system designed for residences. She also invented other devices capable of storing energy captured from sunlight. || 
|}

390801–390900 

|-id=813
| 390813 Debwatson ||  || Deborah Watson Higgins (born 1960), wife of Australian amateur astronomer David Higgins, who discovered this minor planet. || 
|-id=848
| 390848 Veerle ||  || Veerle Demolder, a young mother who was struck by cancer at the age of 32. She inspired many people by communicating honestly about the disease and her fears. Even while being sick herself, she raised money to support people affected by cancer. || 
|}

390901–391000 

|-bgcolor=#f2f2f2
| colspan=4 align=center | 
|}

References 

390001-391000